Tadigaira is a small town in Achham District in the Seti Zone of western Nepal. At the time of the 1991 Nepal census it had a population of 3,724 and had 664 houses in the village.

References

Populated places in Achham District
Village development committees in Achham District